Autozeitung or Auto Zeitung (German: "Automobile Newspaper") is a German-language biweekly automobile enthusiast magazine. It is headquartered in Cologne, Germany.

History and profile
Autozeitung was established in 1969. The magazine is part of the Bauer Media Group and is published by Heinrich Bauer Verlag on a biweekly basis on Wednesdays. The headquarters of the magazine is in Cologne. Its target audience includes men aged 20–49. The magazine features articles about automotive innovations, automotive industry, formula racing, among the others. It has offered annual Auto Trophy awards since 1988.

The circulation of Autozeitung was 204,547 copies during the period of 2010-2011.

See also
 List of magazines in Germany

References

External links
Official website

1969 establishments in West Germany
Auto racing magazines
Bauer Media Group
Biweekly magazines published in Germany
Automobile magazines published in Germany
German-language magazines
Magazines established in 1969
Mass media in Cologne